Krishna Lal Maharjan (born December 15, 1954) in Ombahal, Lalitpur is a Nepalese Politician and serving as the Member Of House Of Representatives (Nepal) elected from Lalitpur-2, Province No. 3. He is member of the Communist Party of Nepal (Unified Socialist).

References

1954 births
Living people
Nepal MPs 2017–2022
Communist Party of Nepal (Unified Socialist) politicians
Nepal Communist Party (NCP) politicians
Nepal MPs 1999–2002
Communist Party of Nepal (Unified Marxist–Leninist) politicians